Ilya Dmitriyevich Leskin (born 4 May 1994) is a Russian professional footballer who most recently played for Granit Mikashevichi.

References

External links 
 
 

1994 births
Living people
People from Bogucharsky District
Russian footballers
Russian expatriate footballers
Association football forwards
Expatriate footballers in Belarus
Russian expatriate sportspeople in Belarus
FC Granit Mikashevichi players
Belarusian Premier League players
Sportspeople from Voronezh Oblast